Wicko is a by-coastal lake on the Slovincian Coast, located in Gmina Postomino, in Sławno County, in the West Pomeranian Voivodeship in Poland. The lake was formed due to a spit closing the body of the water off from the Baltic Sea. The lake is located near the Wicko Morskie Airport in Wicko Morskie.

References

Lakes of Poland
Lakes of West Pomeranian Voivodeship